Arnow is a surname. Notable people with the surname include:

Harriette Simpson Arnow (1908–1986), American novelist
Maxwell Arnow (1902–1984), American casting director
Philip Arnow, American government official
Winston Arnow (1911–1994), American judge

See also
Arlow